Bülach District (Bezirk Bülach) is one of 12 districts of the Canton of Zürich in Switzerland, with some 117,000 inhabitants it is the third largest in the canton. Its administrative capital is Bülach, and the largest municipality in the district is Kloten, the location of Zurich Airport. It includes the Rafzerfeld north of the Rhine, with Rafz, Wil, Hüntwangen and Wasterkingen.

The territory of Bülach has been controlled by Zürich since 1409, the remaining parts followed in the later 15th century (Eglisau 1496), with the exception of the Rafzerfeld, which was acquired by Zürich in 1651.

Municipalities

See also
Municipalities of the canton of Zürich

References

External links

Districts of the canton of Zürich